Nontasilp Thayansilp (born 1936) is a Thai boxer. He competed in the men's featherweight event at the 1956 Summer Olympics.

References

1936 births
Living people
Nontasilp Thayansilp
Nontasilp Thayansilp
Boxers at the 1956 Summer Olympics
Place of birth missing (living people)
Featherweight boxers